A 17α-alkylated anabolic steroid is a synthetic anabolic–androgenic steroid (AAS) that features an alkyl group, specifically a methyl or ethyl group, at the C17α position. Unlike many other AAS, 17α-alkylated AAS are orally active and do not require intramuscular injection. However, they uniquely possess a high potential for hepatotoxicity, which simultaneously limits their use. In addition, some have a high risk of gynecomastia due to uniquely high estrogenic activity, although this does not apply to 17α-alkylated AAS that are also 4,5α-reduced or 19-demethylated (i.e., that are also dihydrotestosterone (DHT) or nandrolone derivatives, respectively). The prototypical example of a 17α-alkylated AAS is methyltestosterone (17α-methyltestosterone).

Structure-activity relationships
Extension of the C17α alkyl chain longer than an ethyl group abolishes androgenic activity and converts the drug into an antiandrogen, as in topterone (17α-propyltestosterone) and allylestrenol (17α-allyl-3-deketo-19-nortestosterone) (an extended-chain variant of ethylestrenol). Conversely, replacement of the C17α alkyl group with an ethynyl group greatly reduces but does not abolish androgenic activity, as in ethisterone (17α-ethynyltestosterone) and norethisterone (17α-ethynyl-19-nortestosterone). Similarly to extension of the C17α alkyl chain, extension of the C17α ethynyl chain abolishes androgenic activity, as with dimethisterone (6α,21-dimethylethisterone). Dienogest, which is antiandrogenic, features extension of the C17α chain in the form of a cyanomethyl group at the C17α position.

List of 17α-alkylated AAS

 Testosterone derivatives
 Marketed
 Bolasterone
 Calusterone
 Chlorodehydromethyltestosterone (CDMT)
 Fluoxymesterone
 Formebolone
 Metandienone (methandrostenolone)
 Methandriol (methylandrostenediol)
 Methyltestosterone
 Oxymesterone
 Penmesterol (penmestrol)
 Tiomesterone
 Never marketed
 Chlorodehydromethylandrostenediol (CDMA)
 Chloromethylandrostenediol (CMA)
 Enestebol
 Ethyltestosterone
 Hydroxystenozole
 Methylclostebol (chloromethyltestosterone)

 Dihydrotestosterone derivatives
 Marketed
 Androisoxazole
 Furazabol
 Mebolazine (dimethazine, dymethazine)
 Mestanolone (methylandrostanolone)
 Oxandrolone
 Oxymetholone
 Stanozolol
 Never marketed
 Desoxymethyltestosterone (DMT)
 Methasterone (methyldrostanolone)
 Methyl-1-testosterone (methyl-δ1-DHT)
 Methylepitiostanol
 Methylstenbolone

 Nandrolone (19-nortestosterone) derivatives
 Marketed
 Ethylestrenol (ethylnandrol)
 Mibolerone
 Norethandrolone (ethylnandrolone, ethylestrenolone)
 Normethandrone (methylestrenolone, normethisterone)
 Propetandrol (propethandrol)
 Never marketed
 Bolenol (ethylnorandrostenol)
 Dimethyltrienolone
 Ethyldienolone
 Methyldienolone
 Methylhydroxynandrolone
 Metribolone (methyltrienolone)
 Norboletone (norbolethone)
 Tetrahydrogestrinone (THG)

See also
 List of androgens/anabolic steroids

References

Androgens and anabolic steroids
Hepatotoxins